If You Don't Stop It... You'll Go Blind!!! is a 1975 American comedy film directed by Keefe Brasselle and I. Robert Levy.

The film was followed two years later by the sequel Can I Do It... 'Til I Need Glasses?

Plot summary
The World Society of Sexual Arts and Sciences holds its annual meeting to select the year's winners of the World Sex awards. The selection committee views film clips of the various contestants (a series of sex-themed comedy sketches). At the final awards show, the golden "dildies" are presented to the winners and Keefe Brasselle sings and dances with showgirls.

Reception
Vincent Canby of The New York Times panned the film as "a collection of witless blackout sketches dealing with infidelity, wedding nights, impotence and masturbation, played by a small cast of not very talented actors." Gene Siskel of the Chicago Tribune, reviewing its first Chicago engagement in 1980, gave the film zero stars out of four and called it a "sleazy, unfunny sex comedy," admitting that "I lasted 30 minutes before walking out." He selected it for a "Dog of the Week" segment on PBS' Sneak Previews. Colin Phalow of The Monthly Film Bulletin wrote: "A tasteless revue of dramatised graffiti, dirty one-liners and 'after-dinner' jokes. Showman Keefe Brasselle co-directs with an embarrassing, misplaced nostalgia for the stale techniques of the weekly comedy hour he hosted on American TV in the late Sixties; the 'big band' score, cramped camerawork, run-on skits, creaking song and dance routines and corny opticals certainly hasn't improved with age."

Despite the scathing reviews, the film proved very successful with undiscriminating college audiences, and earned more than four million dollars at midnight shows across America.

See also
 List of American films of 1975

References

External links 

1975 films
1970s English-language films
Films set in the 1970s
1975 comedy films
American comedy films
Sketch comedy films
1970s American films